Above the City may refer to:

 Above the City (Smoke or Fire album), 2005
 Above the City (Club 8 album), 2013